Raymond Grigsby Keeling (August 24, 1915 - April 1, 1996) was an American football offensive guard and tackle who played two seasons for the Philadelphia Eagles of the NFL. He played nine games in both years.

References

Further reading

1915 births
1996 deaths
American football offensive guards
American football offensive tackles
Philadelphia Eagles players
Texas Longhorns football players
Players of American football from Dallas